SAP Solution Manager is a product developed by the software company SAP SE.  It offers end-to-end application lifecycle management to streamline business processes and proactively address improvement options, increasing efficiency and decreasing risk within SAP customers' existing maintenance agreements and managing the application lifecycle.

Overview 

SAP Solution Manager is a central support and system management suite provided to SAP's customers as part of their license agreement. As an SAP system landscape may include a large number of installed SAP and non-SAP systems, SAP Solution Manager is intended to reduce and centralize the management of these systems as well as end-to-end business processes. SAP Solution Manager covers the complete application lifecycle of an SAP customer's business processes running on premise, hybrid or in the cloud.

In an SAP customer's landscape, SAP Solution Manager is the managing system, and the business suite applications (e.g. ERP, CRM, BI, EP) are the managed systems. Non-SAP systems in the landscape can also be covered as part of end-to-end business process lifecycle management. The managed customer landscape can consist of on-premise, cloud, or a combination of both. Business processes and changes can also be documented during major releases, minor releases and bugfixes, making the platform an important business platform as well as an IT platform to provide a "single source of the truth" reference model for the customer.

The current release of SAP Solution Manager is 7.2, which provides features for both IT and business users for enhancing, automating and improving the management of SAP and non-SAP systems:

 Project Management
 Process Management
 Test Suite
 Change Control Management
 IT Service Management
 Application Operations
 Business Process Operations
 Landscape Management
 Data Volume Management
 Custom Code Management ..

The current version of SAP Solution Manager is SAP Solution Manager 7.2, available since August 2016.

Support Package Stack 15 for SAP Solution Manager 7.2 was released in August 2022, delivering new innovations based on customer innovation requests. Accordingly, the product’s documentation was updated with new release information.

Some of the claimed benefits of using SAP Solution Manager 7.2 are that it helps:

 Support the orchestration of the entire end-to-end customer business scenarios, processes and steps via business process modeling, change control, IT service management and a robust monitoring and alerting infrastructure
 Is the value companion for implementing and operation all of SAP's next generation products, such as SAP S/4HANA
 Provides simple, web-based user interfaces and management dashboards, and embedded graphical modeling capability
 Increases efficiency with both Application and Business Process Operations for central control of critical operations support tasks
 Support the business with business process modeling, automated business blueprint generation, and business process usage analysis and analytics
 Reduces risk from changes to the environment with risk-based testing applications such as the Business Process Change Analyzer and Scope and Effort Analyzer
 Streamlines and reduces the custom code footprint of the customer's SAP systems through Custom Code Management
 Provide customers with generous usage rights for support of non-SAP components and without the need for named system users, included in the customer's SAP Enterprise Support contract
 Includes the powerful Focused Build requirements-to-deploy process, and Focused Insights analytical dashboards at no additional charge as of January 1, 2020 

SAP Solution Manager 7.2 also features improved support for hybrid (on-premises and on-cloud) landscapes, as well as new user interfaces based on SAP Fiori. 7.2 can also run on the SAP HANA database as an option. The SAP Solution Manager Product Roadmap has been updated with more details.

References

 Pontus Borgstrom, Michal Krawczyk, Korneliusz Kordus:  Testing SAP APIs: Strategy and Execution  SAP Press, 2020, ISBN 978-1-4932-1998-8
Marc Schäfer, Matthias Melich: SAP Solution Manager for SAP S/4HANA (1st Edition)  SAP Press, 2016, 
 Nathan Williams: IT Service Management in SAP Solution Manager  SAP Press, 2013, 
 Lars Teuber, Corina Weidmann, and Liane Will:  Monitoring and Operations with SAP Solution Manager  SAP Press, 2014, 
 Michael Kloffer, Marc Thier:  Performing End-to-end Root Cause Analysis Using SAP Solution Manager  SAP Press, 2008, 

Solution Manager